Mary Heath may refer to:

 Mary, Lady Heath (1896–1939), Irish aviator
 Mary Jo Heath (born 1954), American radio music host